Zbynek Mlynarik (born 24 April 1977) is a former professional tennis player from Austria.

Biography
Mlynarik is originally from Czechoslovakia, born in Děčín, a town now part of the Czech Republic. Based in Vienna, he began competing professionally from 1998. He made his only main draw appearance on the ATP Tour at his home event, the 2000 CA-TennisTrophy, where he was beaten the first round by eighth seed Cedric Pioline. At Challenger level he won two titles, the singles at Lübeck in 2001 and the doubles at Canberra in 2004. He competed in the qualifying draws of all four Grand Slam tournaments.

Since retiring from the tour he has lived in the United States. He has worked as a coach and runs My Vienna, a gelato cafe in Beverly Hills, which opened in 2012.

Challenger titles

Singles: (1)

Doubles: (1)

References

External links
 
 

1977 births
Living people
Austrian male tennis players
Czechoslovak emigrants to Austria
People from Děčín
Austrian expatriate sportspeople in the United States